Long Napir is a cluster of four settlements of Penan and Kelabit people in the Limbang division of Sarawak, Malaysia.

Geography
Long Napir is located at the confluence of two rivers, Sungai Medihit and Sungai Limbang, about 90 miles from Limbang. The nearest town is Nanga Medamit; this can be reached in about four hours by 4WD vehicle on logging tracks, but the journey by river takes a day.

Infrastructure
The Resident Office of Limbang has a "URA Hostel" in the Long Napir for the administrative officer who acts as "Up River Agent". There is a primary school, clinic and public telephones; all electricity is from local generators.

Population
The population in 2007 was 241 families, consisting of:
Kelabit: 382 adults, 476 children
Penan: 166 adults, 134 children

Proposed destruction
A proposed hydroelectric dam project in the upper Limbang river would submerge the village and surrounding district.

Neighbouring settlements
Neighbouring settlements include:

References

Villages in Sarawak